An extinct language may be narrowly defined as a language with no native speakers and no descendant languages.  Under this definition, a language becomes extinct upon the death of its last native speaker, the terminal speaker. A language like Latin is not extinct in this sense, because it evolved into the modern Romance languages; it is impossible to state when Latin became extinct because there is a diachronic continuum (compare synchronic continuum) between ancestors Late Latin and Vulgar Latin on the one hand and descendants like Old French and Old Italian on the other; any cutoff date for distinguishing ancestor from descendant is arbitrary. For many languages which have become extinct in recent centuries, attestation of usage is datable in the historical record, and sometimes the terminal speaker is identifiable. In other cases, historians and historical linguists may infer an estimated date of extinction from other events in the history of the sprachraum.

List

21st century
<onlyinclude>

20th century

19th century

18th century

17th century

16th century

15th century

14th century

13th century

11th and 12th centuries

10th century

9th century

8th century

7th century

6th century

5th century

4th century

3rd century

2nd century

1st century

1st century BCE

2nd century BCE

3rd century BCE

4th century BCE

5th century BCE

6th century BCE

7th century BCE

2nd millennium BCE

3rd millennium BCE

Unknown date

See also
 Extinct language
 Language death
 Lists of endangered languages
 Lists of extinct languages

Notes

References

.